Zwarte Piet, also known in English by the translated name Black Pete, is the companion of Saint Nicholas in the folklore of the Low Countries. The earliest known illustration of the character comes from an 1850 book by Amsterdam schoolteacher Jan Schenkman in which he was depicted as a black Moor from Spain.

Those portraying the traditional version of Zwarte Piet usually put on blackface and colourful Renaissance attire in addition to curly wigs and bright red lipstick. The character has been increasingly controversial since the early 2010s and decreasingly prevalent at municipal holiday celebrations in the years that have followed. As of 2021, a revised version, dubbed Sooty Piet, has become more common than the traditional variant at public events, in addition to in television specials, films, social media, and advertising. Sooty Piet features the natural skin tone of the actors playing the character with soot marks created by streaks of dark makeup on their faces.

Traditions 

The Zwarte Piet character is part of the annual Feast of St. Nicholas that is celebrated on the evening of 5 December (Sinterklaasavond, which is known as St. Nicholas' Eve in English) in the Netherlands, Curaçao and Aruba. This is when presents and sweets are traditionally distributed to children. The holiday is celebrated on 6 December in Belgium. The Zwarte Piet characters appear only in the weeks before the Feast of Saint Nicholas, first when the saint is welcomed with a parade as he arrives in the country (generally by boat, having traveled from Madrid, Spain). The tasks of the various Zwarte Piets ( in Dutch) are mostly to amuse children and to distribute kruidnoten and pepernoten in the Netherlands, tangerines and speculoos in Belgium, and other strooigoed (special Sinterklaas-themed sweets) to those who come to meet the saint as he visits schools, stores, and other places.

History

Origins
The Dutch writer Arnold Jan Scheer has researched European traditions involving Sinterklaas and his assistants. He has published several books about the origin of these traditions and claims the origin of ones with black skin dates back to 1,100 BC in Northern Europe when pagan Shamans put on animal skins and painted their faces black with soot to portray mythical creatures of the underworld. According to Jan, these rituals evolved differently across Europe and eventually led to the development of characters including: Krampus, Schmutzli, Knecht Ruprecht, and Zwarte Piet.

According to Hélène Adeline Guerber and other historians, the origin of Sinterklaas and his helpers have been linked by some to the Wild Hunt of Odin. While riding the white horse Sleipnir, he flew through the air as the leader of the Wild Hunt. He was always accompanied by two black ravens, Huginn and Muninn. These helpers would listen, just like Zwarte Piet, at the chimneys of the homes they visited to tell Odin about the good and bad behavior of the mortals below.

The Saint Nicholas tradition contains a number of elements that are not ecclesiastical in origin. In medieval iconography, Saint Nicholas is sometimes presented as taming a chained demon, who may or may not be black. However, no hint of a companion, demon, servant, or any other human or human-like fixed companion to the Saint is found in visual and textual sources from the Netherlands from the 16th until the 19th century. According to a long-standing theory first proposed by Karl Meisen, Zwarte Piet and his equivalents in Germanic Europe were originally presented as one or more enslaved demons forced to assist their captor. These chained and fire-scorched demons may have been redeveloped as black-skinned humans during the early 19th-century in the Netherlands in the likeness of Moors who work as servants for Saint Nicholas. Others believe Zwarte Piet to be a continuation of a custom in which people with blackface appeared in winter solstice rituals.

One or more demons working as helpers for the saint can still be found in various Austrian, German, Swiss, Hungarian, Czech, Slovak, and Polish Saint Nicholas traditions in the characters of Krampus, Père Fouettard, Schmutzli, Perchta, Knecht Ruprecht, Rubbels, Hanstrapp, Little Babushka, Pelzebock, Klaubauf, and Belsnickel. These companions of Saint Nicholas are often depicted as a group of closely related figures who accompany Saint Nicholas through the territories formerly controlled by the Holy Roman Empire. The characters act as foils to the benevolent gift-giver, or strict disciplinarians who threaten to thrash or abduct disobedient children. Mythologist Jacob Grimm associated the character with the pre-Christian spirit kobold, who could be either benevolent or malicious.

The introduction of Zwarte Piet did coincide, by and large, with a change in the depiction of the Sinterklaas character. Prior to this change, he was often quite strict toward poorly behaved children and often presented as a sort of bogeyman. Many of the terrifying characteristics that were later associated with Zwarte Piet were often attributed to him. The presentation of a holy man in this light was troubling for both teachers and priests. After the introduction of Zwarte Piet as Sinterklaas' servant, both characters adopted more gentle personas.

The lyrics of older traditional Sinterklaas songs, still sung today, warn that Sinterklaas and his assistant will leave well-behaved children presents but punish those who have been naughty. They might even take very poorly behaved children to their homeland of Spain in burlap sacks where, according to legend, they'll be forced to assist them in their workshop for an entire season or longer. These songs and stories also warn that a child who has been only slightly naughty will receive a bundle of birch twigs or a lump of coal instead of gifts.

Development and depiction in the 19th and 20th centuries 

In 1850, the Amsterdam-based primary school teacher Jan Schenkman published the book Sint Nikolaas en zijn Knecht ("Saint Nicholas and his Servant" in English). It's widely considered the first time a servant character was included in a printed version of the Saint Nicholas narrative. The servant is depicted as a page who appears as a dark-skinned person wearing clothes associated with Moors. The book also established another mythos that would become standard: the intocht or "entry" ceremony of Saint Nicholas and his servant (then still nameless) involving a steamboat. Schenkman has the two characters arrive from Spain with no reference made to Nicholas' historical homeland of Myra (Lycia, which was located in what is now modern-day Turkey). In the 1850 version of Schenkman's book, the servant is depicted in simple white clothing with red hems. Beginning with the second edition in 1858, the page is illustrated in a much more colorful page costume.

The book remained in print until 1950 and has had considerable influence on the current celebration. Although in Schenkman's book the servant was nameless, author Joseph Albert Alberdingk Thijm provided him with the name "Pieter-me-knecht" in a handwritten note to E.J. Potgieter in 1850. In 1884, Alberdingk Thijm recalled that, when he was a child in 1828, he had attended a Saint Nicholas celebration in the house of Dominico Arata, an Italian merchant and consul living in Amsterdam. On this occasion, a man portraying Saint Nicholas had been accompanied by another described as "Pieter de Knecht ..., a frizzy haired Negro" who brought a large basket filled with presents.

In 1833, an Amsterdam-based magazine printed a humorous reference to "Pietermanknecht" while describing the fate that those who had sneaked out of their houses to attend that year's St. Nicholas celebrations were supposed to have endured after returning home. In 1859, the Dutch newspaper De Tijd noticed that Saint Nicholas was often accompanied by "a Negro, who, under the name of Pieter, mijn knecht, is no less popular than the Holy Bishop himself". In the 1891 book Het Feest van Sinterklaas, the servant is named Pieter. However, up until 1920, several additional publications gave the character other names and depictions that varied considerably.

According to a story from the Legenda Aurea, retold by Eelco Verwijs in his 1863 monograph Sinterklaas, one of the miraculous deeds performed by Saint Nicholas after his death consisted of freeing a boy from slavery at the court of the "Emperor of Babylon" and delivering him back to his parents. No mention is made of the boy's skin color. However, over the course of the 20th century, narratives started to surface that claimed Zwarte Piet was a former slave who had been freed by the saint and had subsequently become his lifelong companion.

One version of the folklore surrounding the character suggests that Zwarte Piet's blackness is due to a permanent layer of soot on his body acquired during his many trips down the chimneys of the homes he visits.

Development and depiction in the 21st century 

Because of ongoing controversies surrounding the character, many schools, businesses, and other organizations across the Netherlands have begun changing Zwarte Piet's clothing and makeup or phasing the character out entirely. The most common variation has been dubbed Sooty Piet (in Dutch: roetveegpiet). This version features the page outfit but without the curly wig, earrings, or lipstick. Smeared on makeup simulates soot smudges and an actor portraying the character retains their own natural skin tone.

The portrayals of both Sinterklaas and Zwarte Piet can also further vary from region to region. Until 2020, the holiday was celebrated in the Netherlands Antilles where Sinterklaas was often played by a white-painted actor who was accompanied by several others dressed as Zwarte Piet.

Notable events during the 21st century 

Throughout the latter half of the 2010s, communities and various organizations across the Netherlands and elsewhere opted to use either the traditional version of Zwarte Piet in celebrations or variations, most commonly the sooty version. Some have included both. These decisions have resulted in protests and violent incidents involving pro-Piet demonstrators (those who endorse the traditional version of the character) and anti-Piet demonstrators (those who endorse a revised version of the character or doing away with him altogether).

In 2015, the Bijenkorf department store chain opted to replace holiday displays featuring Zwarte Piet with a golden-skinned version instead. Elsewhere, one in three Dutch primary schools announced plans to alter the character's appearance in their celebrations. Nickelodeon in the Netherlands also decided to use a racially mixed group of actors to portray Piet in their holiday broadcasts instead of people in blackface. RTL Nederland made a similar decision in the autumn of 2016 and replaced the characters with actors with soot on their faces.

However, in 2018, several members of a production crew refused to work on Dutch broadcaster NTR's nationally televised celebration because of a decision to alter the character.
Several Dutch entertainers have also continued to use the traditional version of the character. Among them are the singers Leon Krijgsman and Herman van Doorn who released songs promoted with music videos featuring Piets in blackface.

In November 2017, a group of anti-Piet demonstrators were prevented from attending a demonstration during a nationally televised celebration in the town of Dokkum after their vehicles were blocked on the A7 motorway by pro-Piet demonstrators, 34 of whom were later charged and found guilty of obstructing traffic. During intocht celebrations throughout November 2018, violent incidents took place in the cities and towns of Nijmegen, The Hague, Leeuwarden, Den Helder, Rotterdam, and elsewhere. In Eindhoven, anti-Piet demonstrators were surrounded by an estimated group of 250 people described as "football hooligans" who attacked them with eggs and shouted racist insults. A similar protest in Tilburg led to the arrest of 44 pro-Piet demonstrators.

In 2019, it was decided that the nationally televised arrival of Sinterklaas hosted by Apeldoorn would feature only sooty versions. That November, a group called Kick Out Zwarte Piet were attacked during a meeting. Windows were smashed, nearby vehicles were vandalized, and fireworks were shot into the building where the group was planning protests in 12 communities that still feature traditional versions of the character. In June 2020, American broadcaster NBC and Netflix opted to remove footage of a character dressed as Zwarte Piet from an episode of The Office. Series creator Greg Daniels released a statement saying that "blackface is unacceptable and making the point so graphically is hurtful and wrong. I am sorry for the pain that caused."

Prime Minister Mark Rutte stated in a parliamentary debate on 5 June 2020 that he had changed his opinion on the issue and now better understands why many people consider the character's appearance to be racist. In August 2020, Facebook updated its policies to ban depictions of blackface on its Facebook and Instagram platforms, including traditional blackface depictions of Zwarte Piet. In October 2020, Google banned advertising featuring Zwarte Piet, including soot versions without blackface.
Additional companies followed suit, among them Bol, Amazon, and Coolblue, who each decided to remove traditional Zwarte Piet products and promotions from their services. In November 2020, Vereniging van Openbare Bibliotheken, a national association of public libraries, also announced that they were in the process of removing books featuring Zwarte Piet from library shelves.

Public opinion in the Low Countries and worldwide 

Owing to the character's depiction, which often involves actors and volunteers dressing up in blackface while wearing black wigs and large earrings, the traditions surrounding Zwarte Piet became increasingly controversial beginning in the late 20th century. The public debate surrounding the figure can be described as polarized, with some protesters considering the figure to be an insult to their ancestry and supporters considering the character to be an inseparable part of their cultural heritage.

Outside of the Netherlands, the character has received criticism from a wide variety of international publications and organizations. In 2015, the United Nations Committee on the Elimination of Racial Discrimination wrote in a report that “the character of Black Pete is sometimes portrayed in a manner that reflects negative stereotypes of people of African descent and is experienced by many people of African descent as a vestige of slavery,” and urged the Netherlands to “actively promote the elimination” of racial stereotyping. American essayist David Sedaris has written about the tradition, and British comedian and activist Russell Brand has spoken negatively of it, the latter dubbing Zwarte Piet "a colonial hangover." In 2019, media personality Kim Kardashian described Zwarte Piet as "disturbing" in a tweet to her over 62 million followers on Twitter.

In 2012 in Amsterdam, most opposition toward the character was found among the Ghanaian, Antillean and Dutch-Surinamese communities, with 50 percent of the Surinamese considering the figure to be discriminatory to others, whereas 27 percent consider the figure to be discriminatory toward themselves. The predominance of the Dutch black community among those who oppose the Zwarte Piet character is also visible among the main anti-Zwarte Piet movements, Zwarte Piet Niet and Zwarte Piet is Racisme which have established themselves since the 2010s. Generally, adherents of these groups consider Zwarte Piet to be part of the Dutch colonial heritage, in which black people were subservient to whites or are opposed to what they consider stereotypical black ("Black Sambo") features of the figure including the red lips, curly hair and large golden earrings.

In the early 2010s, a large majority of the overall populace in both the Netherlands and Belgium was in favor of retaining the traditional Zwarte Piet character. Studies have shown that the perception of Zwarte Piet can differ greatly among different ethnic backgrounds, age groups and regions. According to a 2013 survey, upward of 90 percent of the Dutch public do not perceive Zwarte Piet to be a racist character or associate him with slavery and are opposed to altering the character's appearance. This correlated to a 2015 study among Dutch children aged 3 to 7 which showed that they perceive Zwarte Piet to be a fantastical clownish figure rather than a black person. However, the number of Dutch people who are willing to change certain details of the character (for example his lips and hair) is reported to be growing. By 2018, studies showed that between 80 and 88 percent of the Dutch public did not perceive Zwarte Piet as racist, and between 41 and 54 percent were happy with the character's modernized Sooty Piet style. Others continued to make the case that Zwarte Piet is racist due to extreme undertones, among them that Zwarte Piet is a subservient slave and that the tradition enforces racial stereotypes.

The George Floyd protests and subsequent Black Lives Matter demonstrations in the Netherlands in 2020 appear to have had a significant effect on the acceptance of Zwarte Piet's traditional (blackface) appearance among the Dutch public. A June 2020 survey saw a drop in support for leaving the character's appearance unaltered. 47 percent of those surveyed supported the traditional appearance, compared to 71 percent in a similar survey held in November 2019. A December 2020 survey by EenVandaag revealed that 55 percent of those surveyed supported the traditional appearance of Zwarte Piet, 34 percent supported changing the character's appearance, and 11 percent were unsure. The survey reported that 78 percent did not see Zwarte Piet as a racist figure while 17 percent did. The most frequently mentioned reason of those who were in favor of changing the character was to put an end to the discussion.

In popular culture 

A character named Nate dressed as Zwarte Piet during a scene in a December 2012 episode of The Office (US). It was later removed from Netflix and the NBC streaming service Peacock.

Characterizations of Zwarte Piet were featured in the third season of the American comedy-drama television series Atlanta in 2022. While Alfred (Brian Tyree Henry) and Earn (Donald Glover) are on tour in Amsterdam, they encounter multiple people dressed in blackface and celebrating the Feast of St. Nicholas.

See also

References

Bibliography 
 

Sinterklaas
Christian folklore
Dutch folklore
Belgian folklore
Dutch legendary creatures
Black people in European folklore
Dutch words and phrases
Santa's helpers
Fictional servants
Anti-black racism in the Netherlands
Holiday characters
Fictional toymakers and toy inventors
Controversies in the Netherlands
Controversies in Belgium
Race-related controversies
Racism in Belgium
Companions of Saint Nicholas
Fictional Spanish people
Blackface minstrel characters